Kristian Sheikki Laakso is a Finnish politician currently serving in the Parliament of Finland for the Finns Party at the South-Eastern Finland constituency. He is a member of the Transport and Communications Committee as well as the Environment Committee. Laakso's Parliamentary Assistant is Joona Ikonen.

References

Living people
Members of the Parliament of Finland (2019–23)
Finns Party politicians
21st-century Finnish politicians
Year of birth missing (living people)